Big Brother Brasil 6 was the sixth season of Big Brother Brasil which premiered January 10, 2006 with the season finale airing March 28, 2006 on the Rede Globo television network.

The show was produced by Endemol Globo and presented by news reporter Pedro Bial and directed by J.B Oliveira "Boninho". The prize award was R$1,000,000 without tax allowances.

The winner was 33-year-old nurse Maria Nilza "Mara" Viana from Porto Seguro, Bahia.

General
There were fourteen housemates competing for the grand prize. The season lasted 78 days, a decrease of one day over the previous season. The season produced the first ever all-female Final Two and was the only season (to date) that the Final Two housemates are from the same gender.

Housemates
(ages stated at time of contest)

Future appearances
After this season, in 2006, Mariana Felício appeared in Dança dos Famosos 3, she finished in 9th place.

In 2010, Rafael Valente was contender to be a competitor on Big Brother Brasil 10, but ultimately did not return.

In 2019, Daniel Saullo and Mariana Felicio appeared as a couple in Power Couple Brasil 4, they finished as Runner-Up.

Voting history
The voting table below records whom each housemate voted to nominate on the diary room during his or her time in the House. The Head of Household (HOH) vote (cast in front of the other housemates) automatically nominates one housemate from eviction. Then, the other housemates vote and if the vote is tied, the HOH breaks the tie (all these types of vote count for the total number of nominations received).

References

External links
 Big Brother Brasil 6
 Terra: BBB6

2006 Brazilian television seasons
06